The canton of Haut-Vivarais (before 2016: canton of Lamastre) is an administrative division of the Ardèche department, southern France. Its borders were modified at the French canton reorganisation which came into effect in March 2015. Its seat is in Lamastre.

It consists of the following communes:
 
Alboussière
Ardoix
Arlebosc
Bozas
Champis
Colombier-le-Vieux
Le Crestet
Désaignes
Empurany
Gilhoc-sur-Ormèze
Labatie-d'Andaure
Lafarre
Lalouvesc
Lamastre
Nozières
Pailharès
Préaux
Quintenas
Saint-Alban-d'Ay
Saint-Barthélemy-Grozon
Saint-Basile
Saint-Félicien
Saint-Jeure-d'Ay
Saint-Pierre-sur-Doux
Saint-Prix
Saint-Romain-d'Ay
Saint-Sylvestre
Saint-Symphorien-de-Mahun
Saint-Victor
Satillieu
Vaudevant

References

Cantons of Ardèche